Doncaster UTC is a university technical college in Doncaster, South Yorkshire, England which opened in September 2020.

The college is sponsored by the University of Sheffield, Sheffield Hallam University and local employers. It specialises in engineering, particularly railway engineering, and its newly constructed building in the town centre has capacity for 750 students.

References

External links

University Technical Colleges
Secondary schools in Doncaster
Educational institutions established in 2020
2020 establishments in England
University of Sheffield